The Taliesin Orchestra (alternately known as Taliesin) is an American musical group (generally classified as new-age) that specializes in remaking famous songs into orchestra-style melodies.  The band's first album, Orinoco Flow: The Music of Enya, was a collection of songs originally created and sung by Enya; it was released in 1996.  Since then the band has recorded several other albums, some of them being further Enya remakes, but also including albums of songs by George Winston and Jim Brickman. Originally on Anthem (1997) and again on Rock Rhapsody (2008) the band covered such famous songs such as Pink Floyd's "Another Brick In The Wall", Eric Clapton's "Layla" and The Beatles' "Hey Jude". The band covered the famous music piece "Adagio For Strings"

The Taliesin Orchestra is led by keyboardist Trammell Starks and features the voice, vocal arranging, vocal production, and in some cases songwriting of Felicia Farerre (aka Felicia Sorensen).  Charles Sayre acts as conductor, producer and arranger.

Discography

Enya tributes
 1996 Orinoco Flow: The Music of Enya
 1998 Maiden of Mysteries: Music of Enya
 2002 Thread of Time: The Best of the Music of Enya
 2005 Sail Away: The Music of Enya
 2006 An Instrumental Tribute to the Hits of Enya
 2009 Tribute to the Hits of Enya

Other
 1997 Forbidden Forest: Impressions of George Winston
 1997 Anthem
 2002 Sacred
 2004 Valentine: The Music of Jim Brickman
 2005 Top of the World: A Tribute to the Carpenters
 2008 Rock Rhapsody
 2008 "Bella's Lullaby (Piano Version) For 'Twilight'"

Notes

External links

New-age music groups